Stephen King (born March 6, 1986) is a former American soccer player.

Career

Youth and high school
King attended Shawnee High School where he was a four-year starter (2000–03) under coach Brian Gibney. He led the Renegades to a 99–5–3 record during his tenure, including 2001 and 2003 Group IV state championships. During the latter title run, King's senior year, he recorded 24 goals and 27 assists. King was named the New Jersey Gatorade and NSCAA Player of the Year. He was also selected as a Parade Magazine, EA Student Sports and NSCAA/adidas All-American. Additionally, King was named a USYSA Inter-Regional All-American and finished his prep career with 46 goals and 56 assists.

King was selected to play for the Region I Olympic Development Program team from 1999 to 2004 and participated as a U–16 national pool player. During his earlier years he was the captain of the U–15 national team and also played for the nationally prominent FC Delco club team.

College
Heavily recruited out of high school, King chose the University of Maryland over other high-profile schools such as Wake Forest, Duke, Boston College, Harvard, St. John's and Rutgers.

During his four-year tenure in which he started all 93 contests he played in (a Maryland career starts record), King would lead the Terrapins to two NCAA Sweet Sixteens, the 2004 College Cup, and the 2005 National Championship. He was a Hermann Trophy semi-finalist for his junior and senior seasons, and a Lowe's Senior CLASS Award, College Soccer News First Team All-American and First Team All-ACC for his senior season. According to UMTerps.cstv.com, "King finished his career second all-time in assists at Maryland with 33 while his 93 career points ranks sixth. He also scored 30 goals which is one away from the top 10. His three-assist performance against No. 14 Virginia on November 3, 2007 tied the program record for assists in a game. He racked up 13 assists in 2007 which is the second most in school history in a single season."

King was also named the 2007 ACC Scholar-Athlete of the Year for men's soccer, an award for recognizing the top junior or senior student-athlete in each respective ACC sport. Candidates must maintain a career 3.0 or better grade point average and have gotten 3.0+ each of their past two semesters to qualify. He was also named to ESPN The Magazine's 2007 Academic All-America Men's Soccer Team.

Professional
On January 18, 2008, King became the Maryland Terrapins' 22nd MLS draftee since its inception in 1996. The Chicago Fire selected him in the third round (40th overall). He made his MLS debut against Real Salt Lake on March 29, entering in the 54th minute., and made his first career start against the San Jose Earthquakes on April 12.

King scored his first MLS goal against the New England Revolution on May 3. It was an unassisted goal in the 76th minute.

On November 26, 2008, King was selected by Seattle Sounders FC in the fourth round of the 2008 MLS Expansion Draft. He made his Sounders debut on May 2, 2009 appearing as a substitute against his old club Chicago Fire.

King was traded to D.C. United on April 30, 2010. Seattle received a second-round pick in the 2011 MLS SuperDraft in exchange.  He made his debut for DC a day later in a 2–0 loss at home to the New York Red Bulls.  King signed a new contract with D.C. on September 8, 2011. Terms were undisclosed.

King was released by D.C. United on December 18, 2012.

Statistics

Honors

Seattle Sounders FC
Lamar Hunt U.S. Open Cup (1): 2009

Personal
King is the son of Douglas and Jayne King, and has two brothers, Brian and Sean.

See also
2008 MLS Expansion Draft
2008 MLS SuperDraft

References

External links

1986 births
Living people
People from Medford, New Jersey
Shawnee High School (New Jersey) alumni
Soccer players from New Jersey
Sportspeople from Burlington County, New Jersey
American soccer players
Maryland Terrapins men's soccer players
Chicago Fire FC players
Seattle Sounders FC players
D.C. United players
Major League Soccer players
Chicago Fire FC draft picks
Association football midfielders